Frank S. "Terry" Larkin (1856 – September 16, 1894) was a Major League Baseball pitcher who played for five teams during a six-season career.

Career
Larkin, a right-hander, debuted on May 20,  for the New York Mutuals, pitching a complete game in his only appearance of the season. Larkin was a good hitter for a pitcher and finished 8th in the National League with 32 runs batted in (RBI), while hitting for a .288 average in 1878.

Post-career
In April 1883, Larkin was arrested and hospitalized after shooting his wife, shooting at the responding police officers and then attempting to cut his own throat with a razor. The following month, while still hospitalized, he attempted to kill himself again. He blamed his condition on having "been a sufferer for a long time with malaria." In August of that year, he was sent to prison for six months after being accused of beating his wife. After his release from prison, his father took him into his home. Within a week of his release, Larkin was arrested for pulling his father out of bed at 3:00 in the morning, pulling a gun on him and threatening to shoot him.

Larkin was later institutionalized after challenging his former employer to a duel with pistols, and while apparently still hospitalized committed suicide by slitting his throat with a razor on September 16, 1894 in Brooklyn, New York.  He is interred at Calvary Cemetery in Woodside, New York.

References

External links

1856 births
1894 deaths
19th-century baseball players
Major League Baseball pitchers
New York Mutuals players
Hartford Dark Blues players
Chicago White Stockings players
Troy Trojans players
Richmond Virginians players
Suicides in New York City
Suicides by sharp instrument in the United States
Burials at Calvary Cemetery (Queens)
Brooklyn Atlantics (minor league) players
Washington Nationals (minor league) players
Albany (minor league baseball) players
New York Metropolitans (minor league) players
Richmond Virginias players
Norfolk (minor league baseball) players
Baseball players from New York (state)
1890s suicides